St. Onge or Saint Onge or variants thereof may refer to:

Places
 St. Onge, Ontario (historic), Canada
 St. Onge Township, Lawrence County, South Dakota, U.S.
 Saint Onge, South Dakota, U.S.

People
 Doug J. St. Onge (1934-2021), American politician
 Guylaine St-Onge (1965-2005), Canadian actress

See also
 Saintonge (disambiguation)
 Onge (disambiguation)
 Saintongeais dialect
 Saint-Genis-de-Saintonge, Charente-Maritime, France